The Beaumont Stakes is a Grade III American Thoroughbred horse race for three-year-old fillies over a distance of 7 furlongs and 184 feet on the dirt held annually in early April at Keeneland Race Course, Lexington, Kentucky during the spring meeting.

History

The race is named in honor of the Beaumont Farm of Hal Price Headley, one of Keeneland's founders. The Beaumont is run on the Beard Course which is named after Major Louie Beard, another one of Keeneland's founders.

The event was classified as Grade III in 1990 when it was won the ill-fated 1989 US Champion Two-Year-Old, Go For Wand. In 1993 the event was upgraded to Grade II and held that class until 2016 when it was downgraded back to Grade III.

Records
Speed record
 1:24.90 – Four Graces  (2020) (Track record)

Margins
  lengths – Go For Wand (1990), Matareya (2022)

Most wins by a jockey
 4 – Pat Day (1994, 1997, 1998, 2003)

Most wins by a trainer
 2 – Brian A. Mayberry (1991, 1992)
 2 – Claude R. McGaughey III (1993, 2000)
 2 – Nicholas P. Zito (1996, 2005)
 2 – Kenneth G. McPeek (1994, 2009)
 2 – Todd A. Pletcher (2002, 2017)
 2 – Wesley A. Ward (2012, 2021)

Most wins by an owner
 2 – Jan, Mace & Samantha Siegel (1991, 1992)
 2 – William S. Farish III  (1987, 1997)

Winners

Legend:

 
 

Notes:

† Exact distance is 7 furlongs and 184 feet run on the Beard Course

§ Ran as part of an entry

See also 
 List of American and Canadian Graded races
 Road to the Kentucky Oaks

External links 
 2021 Keeneland Media Guide

References

Graded stakes races in the United States
Grade 3 stakes races in the United States
Flat horse races for three-year-old fillies
Keeneland horse races
1986 establishments in Kentucky
Recurring sporting events established in 1986